Euplectellidae is a family of glass sponges (Hexactinellids) belonging to the order Lyssacinosa, first represented in the Ordovician fossil record, substantially older than molecular estimates of the clade's age.

Taxonomies 
According to the World Register of Marine Species (WoRMS) the family includes the following subfamilies and genera:
Subfamily Bolosominae Tabachnick, 2002
 Advhena Castello-Branco, Collins & Hajdu, 2020
 Amphidiscella Tabachnick & Lévi, 1997
 Amphoreus Reiswig & Kelly, 2018
 Bolosoma Ijima, 1904
 Caulocalyx Schulze, 1886
 Hyalostylus Schulze, 1886
 Neocaledoniella Tabachnick & Lévi, 2004
 Rhizophyta Shen, Dohrmann, Zhang, Lu & Wang, 2019
 Saccocalyx Schulze, 1896
 Trachycaulus Schulze, 1886
 Trychella Reiswig & Kelly, 2018
 Vityaziella Tabachnick & Lévi, 1997
Subfamily Corbitellinae Gray, 1872
 Atlantisella Tabachnick, 2002
 Corbitella Gray, 1867
 Dictyaulus Schulze, 1896
 Dictyocalyx Schulze, 1886
 Hertwigia Schmidt, 1880
 Heterotella Gray, 1867
 Ijimaiella Tabachnick, 2002
 Plumicoma Reiswig & Kelly, 2018
 Pseudoplectella Tabachnick, 1990
 Regadrella Schmidt, 1880
 Rhabdopectella Schmidt, 1880
 Walteria Schulze, 1886
Subfamily Euplectellinae Gray, 1867
 Acoelocalyx Topsent, 1910
 Chaunangium Schulze, 1904
 Docosaccus Topsent, 1910
 Euplectella Owen, 1841
 Holascus Schulze, 1886
 Malacosaccus Schulze, 1886
 Placopegma Schulze, 1895

References

External links 

 
 
 

Hexactinellida
Sponge families
Taxa named by John Edward Gray